Dmytro Bilokolos (5 February 1912, Donetsk Oblast – 9 February 1993, Kyiv) was a Ukrainian politician and diplomat. Minister of Foreign Affairs of the Ukrainian SSR (1966–1970). He was also Soviet ambassador to Zambia and Botswana (1970–76).

Education 
Dmytro Bilokolos graduated from the Faculty of History of the National University of Kharkiv (1936).

Professional career and experience 
In 1936–1941 – he worked history teacher, director of high school in Donetsk. In 1941–1945 – he was a veteran of World War II. In 1947–1952 – Head of the department of agitation and propaganda secretary of the Donetsk City Committee of the Communist Party of Ukraine. In 1952–1955 – he studied of the Academy of Social Sciences in Moscow. In 1955 – he headed of the Department of Science and Culture, Secretary of the Donetsk Regional Committee of the Communist Party. From 16 March 1966 to 11 June 1970 – Minister of Foreign Affairs of the Ukrainian SSR Headed the Ukrainian delegation to XXI–XXIV sessions of the UN General Assembly. From 10 June 1970 to 23 June 1976 – Ambassador Extraordinary and Plenipotentiary of the Soviet Union in Zambia. From 16 September 1970 to 23 June 1976 – Ambassador Extraordinary and Plenipotentiary of the Soviet Union in Botswana in combination.

Diplomatic rank 
 Ambassador extraordinary and plenipotentiary

References

External links 
 Bilokolos, Dmytro (Zakharovych)
 Diplomacy in the Former Soviet Republics James P. Nichol Greenwood Publishing Group, 1.01.1995 – 244.
 Soroka D. I. Historical retrospective of Ukraine's cooperation with the United Nations
 Memorial plaque Dmytro Bilokolos

1912 births
1993 deaths
People from Donetsk Oblast
National University of Kharkiv alumni
Ambassadors of the Soviet Union to Botswana
Ambassadors of the Soviet Union to Zambia
Politicians of the Ukrainian Soviet Socialist Republic
Soviet foreign ministers of Ukraine
Recipients of the Order of the Red Banner of Labour
Recipients of the Order of the Red Star